The following lists events that happened during 2014 in Chile.

Incumbents
 President: Sebastián Piñera (RN) (left office on March 11), Michelle Bachelet (Socialist) (took office on March 11)

Events
 December 4  Santiago on Tour Devo Live 
 December 6  Santiago Rockout Festival Devo Live On Tour

March
 March 17 – A 6.7 magnitude earthquake strikes off the coast of Chile with officials issuing precautionary tsunami warnings for the nation's coast.

April
 April 1 – An 8.2 magnitude earthquake occurs in the Pacific Ocean near Chile causing landslides and killing at least five people. A tsunami warning is issued.
 April 2 – The President of Chile Michelle Bachelet declares the northern part of Chile to be a disaster zone including the regions of Arica y Parinacota, and Tarapacá.
 April 13 – A massive forest fire in Valparaíso destroys thousands of homes and leaves 11 people dead.

September
 September 8 – A fire extinguisher bomb exploded in the Escuela Militar metro station in Santiago, injuring 14 people, several seriously.

References

 
Years of the 21st century in Chile
2010s in Chile
Chile
Chile